The NASA/IPAC Extragalactic Database (NED) is an online astronomical database for astronomers that collates and cross-correlates astronomical information on extragalactic objects (galaxies, quasars, radio, x-ray and infrared sources, etc.). NED was created in the late 1980s by two Pasadena astronomers, George Helou and Barry F. Madore. NED is funded by NASA and is operated by the Infrared Processing and Analysis Center (IPAC) on the campus of the California Institute of Technology, under contract with NASA.

NED is built around a master list of extragalactic objects for which cross-identifications of names have been established, accurate positions and redshifts entered to the extent possible, and some basic data collected. Bibliographic references relevant to individual objects have been compiled, and abstracts of extragalactic interest are kept on line. Detailed and referenced photometry, position, and redshift data, have been taken from large compilations and from the literature.

NED also includes images from 2MASS, from the literature, and from the Digitized Sky Survey.

As of March 2014, NED contains 206 million distinct astronomical objects with 232 million cross-identifications across multiple wavelengths, with redshift measurements for 5 million objects, 1.9 billion photometric data points, 609 million diameter measurements, 71 thousand redshift-independent distances for over 15 thousand galaxies, 310 thousand detailed classifications for 230 thousand objects, and 2.6 million images, maps and external links, together with links to 65 thousand journal articles, notes and abstracts.

See also
SIMBAD - a database of information on Galactic objects, maintained by the Centre de Données astronomiques de Strasbourg, France
 NASA's Planetary Data System (PDS) - a database of information on solar system objects, also maintained by JPL
 NASA Astrophysics Data System (ADS)
 Bibcode

References

External links
NED

Astronomical databases
Government databases in the United States